The 2013 WNBA season was the 15th season for the Connecticut Sun franchise in the Women's National Basketball Association, and their 11th since moving to Connecticut from Orlando.

Transactions

WNBA Draft
The following are the Dream's selections in the 2013 WNBA Draft.

Trades

Personnel changes

Additions

Subtractions

Roster

Depth

Season standings

Schedule

Preseason

|- style="background:#cfc;"
		 | 1 
		 | May 11
		 |  NY Liberty
		 | 
		 | Allison Hightower (12)
		 | Natasha Lacy (5)
		 | Kara Lawson (4)
		 | Mohegan Sun Arena6692
		 | 1–0
|- style="background:#fcc;"
		 | 2 
		 | May 18
		 | @ NY Liberty
		 | 
		 | Ashley Walker (12)
		 | Natasha Lacy (7)
		 | Lawson & Lacy (3)
		 | Prudential Center1945
		 | 1–1
|- style="background:#cfc;"
		 | 3 
		 | May 21
		 | @ Minnesota
		 | 
		 | Tan White (12)
		 | Ashley Walker (10)
		 | Kara Lawson (6)
		 | Target Center2803
		 | 2–1

Regular season

|- style="background:#cfc;"
		 | 1 
		 | May 25
		 |  NY Liberty
		 | 
		 | Kara Lawson (23)
		 | Tina Charles (13)
		 | Kara Lawson (5)
		 | Mohegan Sun Arena7672
		 | 1–0
|- style="background:#fcc;"
		 | 2 
		 | May 31
		 | @ Chicago
		 | 
		 | Allison Hightower (20)
		 | Tina Charles (15)
		 | Kara Lawson (4)
		 | Allstate Arena6607
		 | 1–1

|- style="background:#fcc;"
		 | 3 
		 | June 1
		 | @ Minnesota
		 | 
		 | Charles & Lawson (22)
		 | Tina Charles (10)
		 | Hightower & Lawson (4)
		 | Target Center9223
		 | 1–2
|- style="background:#fcc;"
		 | 4 
		 | June 7
		 |  Washington
		 | 
		 | Tina Charles (21)
		 | Tina Charles (12)
		 | Allison Hightower (5)
		 | Mohegan Sun Arena6150
		 | 1–3
|- style="background:#cfc;"
		 | 5 
		 | June 12
		 | @ Indiana
		 | 
		 | Tina Charles (30)
		 | Tina Charles (10)
		 | Kalana Greene (5)
		 | Bankers Life Fieldhouse6283
		 | 2–3
|- style="background:#fcc;"
		 | 6 
		 | June 14
		 | @ NY Liberty
		 | 
		 | Allison Hightower (17)
		 | Griffin & Bass (8)
		 | Kara Lawson (6)
		 | Prudential Center5845
		 | 2–4
|- style="background:#fcc;"
		 | 7 
		 | June 16
		 |  Seattle
		 | 
		 | Allison Hightower (17)
		 | Griffin & Charles (6)
		 | Hightower, Lawson, Bass, & Castro Marques (2)
		 | Mohegan Sun Arena6550
		 | 2–5
|- style="background:#fcc;"
		 | 8 
		 | June 23
		 |  Atlanta
		 | 
		 | Tina Charles (19)
		 | Tina Charles (12)
		 | Allison Hightower (5)
		 | Mohegan Sun Arena7557
		 | 2–6
|- style="background:#fcc;"
		 | 9 
		 | June 29
		 |  Phoenix
		 | 
		 | Tina Charles (25)
		 | Tina Charles (13)
		 | Greene & Carter (2)
		 | Mohegan Sun Arena9110
		 | 2–7

|- style="background:#cfc;"
		 | 10 
		 | July 2
		 |  Tulsa
		 | 
		 | Allison Hightower (18)
		 | Tina Charles (13)
		 | Sydney Carter (8)
		 | Mohegan Sun Arena5701
		 | 3–7
|- style="background:#fcc;"
		 | 11 
		 | July 6
		 | @ Indiana
		 | 
		 | Griffin & Hightower (17)
		 | Kelsey Griffin (8)
		 | Iziane Castro Marques (3)
		 | Bankers Life Fieldhouse6383
		 | 3–8
|- style="background:#fcc;"
		 | 12 
		 | July 12
		 |  Chicago
		 | 
		 | Tina Charles (29)
		 | Greene & Castro Marques (7)
		 | Kara Lawson (5)
		 | Mohegan Sun Arena6285
		 | 3–9
|- style="background:#cfc;"
		 | 13 
		 | July 14
		 |  San Antonio
		 | 
		 | Allison Hightower (23)
		 | Tina Charles (10)
		 | Kara Lawson (6)
		 | Mohegan Sun Arena6335
		 | 4–9
|- style="background:#fcc;"
		 | 14 
		 | July 19
		 | @ Tulsa
		 | 
		 | Allison Hightower (14)
		 | Tina Charles (12)
		 | Tan White (3)
		 | BOK Center5294
		 | 4–10
|- style="background:#fcc;"
		 | 15 
		 | July 20
		 | @ San Antonio
		 | 
		 | Tina Charles (18)
		 | Tina Charles (12)
		 | Tan White (3)
		 | AT&T Center8375
		 | 4–11
|- style="background:#fcc;"
		 | 16 
		 | July 24
		 | @ Atlanta
		 | 
		 | Greene & Charles (14)
		 | Tina Charles (16)
		 | Mistie Bass (3)
		 | Philips Arena4434
		 | 4–12

|- align="center"
|colspan="9" bgcolor="#bbcaff"|All-Star Break
|- style="background:#cfc;"
		 | 17 
		 | August 1
		 |  Indiana
		 | 
		 | Tina Charles (22)
		 | Tina Charles (12)
		 | Renee Montgomery (5)
		 | Mohegan Sun Arena4971
		 | 5–12
|- style="background:#cfc;"
		 | 18 
		 | August 3
		 | @ NY Liberty
		 | 
		 | Tina Charles (21)
		 | Tina Charles (14)
		 | Allison Hightower (8)
		 | Prudential Center6245
		 | 6–12
|- style="background:#fcc;"
		 | 19 
		 | August 6
		 |  Los Angeles
		 | 
		 | Tina Charles (25)
		 | Tina Charles (13)
		 | Allison Hightower (4)
		 | Mohegan Sun Arena5792
		 | 6–13
|- style="background:#fcc;"
		 | 20 
		 | August 9
		 |  Chicago
		 | 
		 | Allison Hightower (13)
		 | Tina Charles (10)
		 | Griffin, Hightower, & Montgomery (2)
		 | Mohegan Sun Arena6086
		 | 6–14
|- style="background:#fcc;"
		 | 21 
		 | August 11
		 | @ Washington
		 | 
		 | Tina Charles (18)
		 | Tina Charles (12)
		 | Allison Hightower (5)
		 | Verizon Center7725
		 | 6–15
|- style="background:#cfc;"
		 | 22 
		 | August 14
		 |  Atlanta
		 | 
		 | Tina Charles (25)
		 | Kelly Faris (7)
		 | Renee Montgomery (4)
		 | Mohegan Sun Arena5206
		 | 7–15
|- style="background:#fcc;"
		 | 23 
		 | August 16
		 | @ Atlanta
		 | 
		 | Iziane Castro Marques (18)
		 | Kayla Pedersen (8)
		 | Kelsey Griffin (2)
		 | Philips Arena4435
		 | 7–16
|- style="background:#fcc;"
		 | 24 
		 | August 18
		 | @ Chicago
		 | 
		 | Tan White (16)
		 | Kelly Faris (7)
		 | Montgomery & Greene (4)
		 | Allstate Arena5074
		 | 7–17
|- style="background:#fcc;"
		 | 25 
		 | August 22
		 |  Minnesota
		 | 
		 | Tina Charles (22)
		 | Tina Charles (12)
		 | Renee Montgomery (5)
		 | Mohegan Sun Arena7088
		 | 7–18
|- style="background:#fcc;"
		 | 26 
		 | August 25
		 |  NY Liberty
		 | 
		 | Kelsey Griffin (22)
		 | Kelsey Griffin (10)
		 | Renee Montgomery (6)
		 | Mohegan Sun Arena7004
		 | 7–19
|- style="background:#fcc;"
		 | 27 
		 | August 27
		 | @ Los Angeles
		 | 
		 | Iziane Castro Marques (19)
		 | Tina Charles (9)
		 | Montgomery, Castro Marques, & Carter (3)
		 | Staples Center11401
		 | 7–20
|- style="background:#fcc;"
		 | 28 
		 | August 29
		 | @ Seattle
		 | 
		 | Tina Charles (18)
		 | Mistie Bass (6)
		 | Montgomery, White, & Bass (2)
		 | Key Arena5567
		 | 7–21
|- style="background:#fcc;"
		 | 29 
		 | August 31
		 | @ Phoenix
		 | 
		 | Tina Charles (16)
		 | Tina Charles (13)
		 | Renee Montgomery (5)
		 | US Airways Center8119
		 | 7–22

|- style="background:#cfc;"
		 | 30 
		 | September 6
		 |  Washington
		 | 
		 | Tan White (26)
		 | Mistie Bass (10)
		 | Tan White (6)
		 | Mohegan Sun Arena5611
		 | 8–22
|- style="background:#fcc;"
		 | 31 
		 | September 7
		 | @ Indiana
		 | 
		 | Kelsey Griffin (14)
		 | Mistie Bass (11)
		 | White, Montgomery, & Pedersen (2)
		 | Bankers Life Fieldhouse9826
		 | 8–23
|- style="background:#cfc;"
		 | 32 
		 | September 11
		 |  Atlanta
		 | 
		 | Mistie Bass (15)
		 | Bass & Pedersen (6)
		 | Renee Montgomery (7)
		 | Mohegan Sun Arena5724
		 | 9–23
|- style="background:#fcc;"
		 | 33 
		 | September 13
		 | @ Washington
		 | 
		 | Mistie Bass (13)
		 | Kayla Pedersen (7)
		 | Mistie Bass (3)
		 | Verizon Center7779
		 | 9–24
|- style="background:#cfc;"
		 | 34 
		 | September 15
		 |  Indiana
		 | 
		 | Iziane Castro Marques (19)
		 | Mistie Bass (12)
		 | Renee Montgomery (8)
		 | Mohegan Sun Arena8478
		 | 10–24

Statistics

Regular season

Awards and honors

References

External links

Connecticut Sun seasons
Connecticut
Connecticut Sun